Giampiero Pinzi  (born 11 March 1981) is an Italian former professional footballer who played as a midfielder.

Club career

Lazio

Pinzi began his career with Lazio and was promoted in 1999 to the Serie A team.

Udinese

After one-year with S.S. Lazio in the Serie A signed with League rival Udinese Calcio.

Chievo
On 17 July 2009, A.C. Chievo Verona announced that they would be keeping the Udinese midfielder on loan for another season.

Return to Udinese
Pinzi returned to Udinese for the 2010–11 Serie A season, after the departure of Gaetano D'Agostino and Simone Pepe. Pinzi formed the club's central midfield trio with the energetic Gökhan Inler and Kwadwo Asamoah in Udinese's new 3–5–2 (or 5–3–2 formation); he provided 6 assists.

After the departure of Alexis Sánchez, Pinzi changed to play attacking midfielder role, partnered with forward Antonio Di Natale in new 4–1–4–1 (or 4–4–1–1) formation, with Asamoah and Emmanuel Agyemang-Badu as cover against Arsenal. With the new signing Gabriel Torje and Diego Fabbrini arrived, Pinzi again formed new partnership role with either or both players. After the departure of Torje and arrival of Maicosuel, Pinzi still able to secure a place in starting XI.

In October 2012 he signed a new contract which last until 30 June 2016.

Return to Chievo
After 15 years played for Udinese, on 31 August 2015, last day of transfer market, Pinzi returned to Chievo, where he had played between 2008 and 2010.

Brescia
On 10 August 2016, Pinzi signed for Serie B club Brescia on a free transfer.

Padova
On 8 January 2019, he was released from his contract by Padova by mutual consent.

International career
With the Under-21 Italian team, Pinzi won the 2004 UEFA European Under-21 Championship and a bronze medal at 2004 Summer Olympics. He made his senior international debut and only cap for Italy in 2005.

Career statistics

Club

International

Honours
Udinese
UEFA Intertoto Cup: 2000

Orders
 5th Class / Knight: Cavaliere Ordine al Merito della Repubblica Italiana: 2004

References

1981 births
Living people
Association football midfielders
Footballers at the 2004 Summer Olympics
Italian footballers
Italy international footballers
Italy under-21 international footballers
Italy youth international footballers
Olympic bronze medalists for Italy
Olympic footballers of Italy
Footballers from Rome
S.S. Lazio players
Udinese Calcio players
A.C. ChievoVerona players
Brescia Calcio players
Calcio Padova players
Serie A players
Serie B players
Serie C players
Olympic medalists in football
Medalists at the 2004 Summer Olympics
Knights of the Order of Merit of the Italian Republic